Susan Bernofsky (born 1966) is an American translator of German-language literature and author. She is best known for bringing the Swiss writer Robert Walser to the attention of the English-speaking world, translating many of his books and writing his biography. She has also translated several books by Jenny Erpenbeck and Yoko Tawada. Her prizes for translation include the 2006 Helen and Kurt Wolff Translation Prize, the 2012 Calw Hermann Hesse Prize, the 2015 Oxford-Weidenfeld Translation Prize, the 2015 Independent Foreign Fiction Prize, and the 2015 Schlegel-Tieck Prize. She was also selected for a Guggenheim Fellowship in 2014. In 2017 she won the Warwick Prize for Women in Translation for her translation of Memoirs of a Polar Bear by Yoko Tawada. In 2018 she was awarded the MLA's Lois Roth Award for her translation of Go, Went, Gone by Jenny Erpenbeck.

She teaches at Columbia University.

Books
 Clairvoyant of the Small: The Life of Robert Walser (Yale University Press, 2021)
 Finalist, National Book Critics Circle Award for Biography
 In Translation: Translators on Their Work and What It Means (co-editor with Esther Allen, Columbia University Press, 2013)

Translations

Robert Walser
 Looking at Pictures 
 The Walk 
 Berlin Stories 
 The Assistant 
 Microscripts 
 The Tanners  
 The Robber 
 Masquerade and Other Stories

Jenny Erpenbeck
 The Old Child and Other Stories 
 The Book of Words 
 Visitation
 The End of Days 
 Go, Went, Gone

Yoko Tawada
 Memoirs of a Polar Bear 
 The Naked Eye
 Where Europe Begins

Selected others
 The Metamorphosis by Franz Kafka
 Perpetual Motion by Paul Scheerbart
 The Magic Flute (Mozart opera libretto) by Emanuel Schikaneder commissioned by director Isaac Mizrahi for the Opera Theatre of St. Louis
 The Black Spider by Jeremias Gotthelf
 False Friends by Uljana Wolf 
 Siddhartha by Hermann Hesse
 Celan Studies by Peter Szondi
 The Trip to Bordeaux by Ludwig Harig
 Anecdotage: A Summation by Gregor von Rezzori

References

American translators
1966 births
Living people
German–English translators
American women writers
Literary translators
21st-century American women